The 1995–96 Cypriot Third Division was the 25th season of the Cypriot third-level football league. Ermis Aradippou won their 2nd title.

Format
Fourteen teams participated in the 1995–96 Cypriot Third Division. All teams played against each other twice, once at their home and once away. The team with the most points at the end of the season crowned champions. The first three teams were promoted to the 1996–97 Cypriot Second Division and the last three teams were relegated to the 1996–97 Cypriot Fourth Division.

Point system
Teams received three points for a win, one point for a draw and zero points for a loss.

League standings

Sources

See also
 Cypriot Third Division
 1995–96 Cypriot First Division
 1995–96 Cypriot Cup

Cypriot Third Division seasons
Cyprus
1995–96 in Cypriot football